Mark McGann Blyth (born 29 September 1967) is a Scottish-American political economist. He is currently the William R. Rhodes Professor of International Economics and  Professor of International and Public Affairs at Brown University. At Brown, Blyth additionally directs the William R. Rhodes Center for International Economics and Finance at the Watson Institute for International and Public Affairs.

Early life
Blyth grew up in Dundee, Scotland and was raised by his grandmother after his mother died shortly after child birth. He played bass in rock bands and noted in an interview that "I was a musician from age 14 to 28. I've released five or six albums, but all with independent labels that never went anywhere. If they had, I wouldn't be here. I'd be lying on a beach with Heidi Klum."

In 1991, Blyth received a Walker Bequest award from the University of Strathclyde and a Scottish International Educational Trust Award for Study in the United States. He eventually became a US citizen.

Education and career
Blyth received a BA in political science from the University of Strathclyde in 1990. He went on to receive a MA in political science in 1993, an MPhil of political science in 1995, and a PhD in political science in 1999 from Columbia University.

In 1997, Blyth joined the faculty of Johns Hopkins University as an assistant professor of political science. From 2005 to 2009, he was an associate professor of political science at Johns Hopkins.

In 2009, Blyth became a professor of international political economy at Brown University's Department of Political Science. Since 2014, he has been the Eastman Professor of Political Economy as part of a joint appointment at Brown University's Watson Institute for International Studies and the Department of Political Science.

As of 2020, Blyth is the William R. Rhodes '57 Professor of International Economics and Director of the Rhodes Center for International Economics and Finance at Brown University.

Blyth is known for his scholarship on economic ideas. In International Political Economy, he is part of an "ideational turn" that offers sociologically informed approaches to markets and politics.

Blyth criticized austerity in his book Austerity: The History of a Dangerous Idea, which was described by Salon writer Elias Esquith as "necessary reading" and as an economics primer, a polemic, and a history that offers "insight into austerity's lineage, its theories, its champions and its failures...Mark Blyth's new book explains the damaging consequences of austerity in Europe and the U.S." Blyth characterized the argument advanced by austerity advocates as "a canard" and "complete horseshit".

Using the term "Trumpism", Blyth argues that there are similar anti-establishment movements across the developed world.

In August of 2020, Blyth expressed his support for Scottish independence from the United Kingdom. He sits on the Scottish Government's Advisory Council on transforming Scotland's economy, chaired by Cabinet Secretary for Finance and the Economy Kate Forbes.

Works

Books

Selected articles
A more complete list can be found on Mark Blyth's curriculum vitae.

References

Further reading

External links
Chris Hedges’ "On Contact: The Cost of Austerity", with economist Mark Blyth. Truthdig. 12 September 2016.

1967 births
Living people
Columbia Graduate School of Arts and Sciences alumni
Johns Hopkins University faculty
Brown University faculty
People from Dundee
Scottish expatriates in the United States
British political scientists
Scottish political scientists
American political scientists